Sam Glover (26 December 1901 – 8 August 1984) was  a former Australian rules footballer who played with Footscray in the Victorian Football League (VFL).

Notes

External links 
		

1901 births
1984 deaths
Australian rules footballers from Victoria (Australia)
Western Bulldogs players